The 2004 Stock Car Brasil was the 27th Stock Car Brasil season. It began on March 1 at the Curitiba and ended on November 28 at Interlagos, after twelve rounds.

Teams and drivers
All cars used Chevrolet Astra Stock Car chassis. All drivers were Brazilian-registered, except Gabriel Furlán, who raced under Argentine racing license.

References

Stock Car Brasil
Stock Car Brasil seasons